Guadalupe is a Mexican telenovela produced by Valentín Pimstein for Televisa in 1984. Is an adaptation of the Argentine telenovela of the same name produced in 1972.

Alma Delfina and Jaime Garza starred as the protagonists, while Oscar Morelli and Rebecca Rambal starred as the antagonists.

Cast 
Alma Delfina as Guadalupe
Jaime Garza as Francisco Javier/Raúl
Oscar Morelli as Leopoldo
Rebecca Rambal as Elvira
July Furlong as Sara
Elsa Cárdenas as Leonor
Aurora Molina as Rufina
Ana Silvia Garza as Teresa
Magda Karina as Chayo
Nailea Norvind as Nani
Sylvia Suárez as Rosalia
Nayelli Zaldivar as Luisita
Jose Roberto Hill as Gerardo
Flor Trujillo as Aurora
Gerardo Paz as Pedro
Elvira Monsell as Yolanda
Carmen Belén Richardson as Dominga
Porfirio Bas as Carlos
Cristina Peñalvert as Marisol
Christoper Lago as Arturito
Manuel Saval as Roberto
Antonio Brillas as Father Florencio

Awards

References

External links 
 

1984 Mexican television series debuts
1984 Mexican television series endings
1984 telenovelas
Mexican telenovelas
Televisa telenovelas
Television shows set in Mexico City
Mexican television series based on Argentine television series
Spanish-language telenovelas